Carvoeiro may refer to:

Places:
 Carvoeiro, a village on the Rio Negro, in the municipality of Barcelos in the state of Amazonas, in Brazil.
 Carvoeiro, Cape Verde, a village on the Island of São Nicolau in the Cape Verde Islands
 Carvoeiro (Lagoa), a civil parish/freguesia and a beach (Praia de Carvoeiro) in the concelho of Lagoa (Algarve), Portugal
 Carvoeiro, a civil parish/freguesia in the concelho of Mação, Portugal
 Carvoeiro, a civil parish/freguesia in the concelho of Viana do Castelo, Portugal
 Cabo Carvoeiro (Cape Carvoeiro), on the Atlantic Ocean, in the concelho of Peniche, Portugal (west coast)
 Cabo Carvoeiro (Cape Carvoeiro), on the Atlantic Ocean, in the concelho of Lagoa (Algarve), Portugal (south coast)

Other:
 the legume tree Tachigali paniculata; see Tachigali